Mogilev or Mahilyow is a city in eastern Belarus, on the Dnieper River, about  from the border with Russia's Smolensk Oblast and  from Bryansk Oblast. , its population was 360,918, up from an estimated 106,000 in 1956.  It is the administrative centre of Mogilev Region and the third-largest city in Belarus.

History 

The city was first mentioned in historical records in 1267. From the 14th century, it was part of the Grand Duchy of Lithuania, and since the Union of Lublin (1569), part of the Polish–Lithuanian Commonwealth, where it became known as Mohylew. In the 16th-17th centuries, the city flourished as one of the main nodes of the east–west and north–south trading routes.

In 1577, Polish King Stefan Batory granted it city rights under Magdeburg law. In 1654, the townsmen negotiated a treaty of surrender to the Russians peacefully, if the Jews were to be expelled and their property divided up among Mogilev's inhabitants.  Tsar Aleksei Mikhailovitch agreed. However, instead of expelling the Jews, the Russian troops massacred them after they had led them to the outskirts of the town. The city was set afire by Peter the Great's forces in 1708, during the Great Northern War. After the First Partition of Poland in 1772, Mogilev became part of the Russian Empire and became the centre of the Mogilev Governorate. In 1938 it was decided Mogilev was to become the capital of Belarus because Minsk was too close to the then-Polish-Soviet border.

In the years 1915–1917, during World War I, the Stavka, the headquarters of the Russian Imperial Army, was based in the city  and the Tsar, Nicholas II, spent long periods there as Commander-in-Chief.

Following the Russian Revolution, in 1918, the city was briefly occupied by Germany and placed under their short-lived Belarusian People's Republic. In 1919, Mogilev was captured by the forces of Soviet Russia and incorporated into the Byelorussian SSR. Up to World War II and the Holocaust, like many other cities in Europe, Mogilev had a significant Jewish population: according to the Russian census of 1897, out of the total population of 41,100, 21,500 were Jews (i.e. over 50 percent). In 1938 the leadership of Soviet Belarus decided to move the capital of the country from Minsk to Mogilev. Due to that, the now-Mogilev City Council building was built in 1938–1940 with the aim of being the government building. It was designed to resemble the Minsk Government building.

During Operation Barbarossa, the city was conquered by Wehrmacht forces on 26 July 1941 and remained under German occupation until 28 June 1944. Mogilev became the official residence of High SS and police leader (HSSPF) Erich von dem Bach. During that period, the Jews of Mogilev were ghettoized and systematically murdered by Ordnungspolizei and SS personnel. Heinrich Himmler personally witnessed the executions of 279 Jews on 23 October 1941. Later that month, a number of mentally disabled patients were poisoned with car exhaust fumes as an experiment; the method of killing was thereafter applied in several Nazi extermination camps. Initial plans for establishing a death camp in Mogilev were abandoned in favour of Maly Trostenets.

In 1944, with the Mogilev offensive, the devastated city was liberated by the Red Army and returned to Soviet control. Mogilev then was the site of a labour camp for German POW soldiers.

Since Belarus gained its independence in 1991, Mogilev has remained one of its principal cities.

Religion 
Mohilev was the episcopal see of the Latin Catholic Archdiocese of Mohilev until its 1991 merger into the Roman Catholic Archdiocese of Minsk-Mohilev.

It remains the see of the Eparchy (Eastern diocese) of Mogilev and Mstsislaw in the Belarusian Exarchate of the Russian Orthodox Church.

Economy 
After World War II, a huge metallurgy centre with several major steel mills was built. Also, several major factories of cranes, cars, tractors and a chemical plant were established. By the 1950s, tanning was Mogilev's principal industry, and it was a major trading centre for cereal, leather, salt, sugar, fish, timber and flint: the city has been home to a major inland port on the Dnieper river since and an airport since. Since the fall of the Soviet Union and the establishment of Belarus as an independent country, Mogilev has become one of that country's main economic and industrial centres.

Cityscape

The town's most notable landmark is the late 17th-century town hall, named the Ratuša, that was built during the times of the Polish–Lithuanian Commonwealth. The grand tower of the town hall sustained serious damage during the Great Northern War and the Great Patriotic War. It was eventually demolished in 1957 and rebuilt in its pre-war form in 2008.

Another important landmark of Mogilev is the six-pillared St. Stanisław's Cathedral, built in the Baroque style between 1738 and 1752 and distinguished by its frescoes.

The convent of St. Nicholas preserves its magnificent cathedral of 1668, as well as the original iconostasis, bell tower, walls, and gates. It is currently under consideration to become a UNESCO World Heritage site.

Minor landmarks include the archiepiscopal palace and memorial arch, both dating from the 1780s, and the enormous theater in a blend of the Neo-Renaissance and Russian Revival styles.

At Polykovichi, an urban part of Mogilev, there is a 350 metre tall guyed TV mast, one of the tallest structures in Belarus.

Geography

Climate 
Mogilev has a warm-summer humid continental climate (Köppen climate classification Dfb) with warm summers and cold winters.

Notable citizens

Rita Achkina, cross country skier
Matest M. Agrest, ethnologist and mathematician
Modest Altschuler, orchestra conductor
Abe Anellis, microbiologist
 Kanstancin Dziubajla (nom de guerre "Dranik")(1988-2022), Belarusian volunteer killed in action defending Ukraine during the 2022 Russian invasion
Petr Elfimov, musician
Ihar Hershankou, serial killer
Alyona Lanskaya, singer
Joseph Lookstein, Rabbi and President of Bar-Ilan University
Leonid Isaakovich Mandelshtam, physicist
Andrey Melnikov, soldier and recipient of Hero of the Soviet Union award
 Andrej Mryj, satirical writer, journalist, translator and a victim of Stalin's purges
 Ivan Nasovič, author of the first Belarusian dictionary 
Stanisław Julian Ostroróg, Polish count, Crimean War veteran, noted Victorian Photographic portraitist, naturalised British subject
David Pinski, Yiddish playwright
Simeon Piščević, major-general and governor of Mogilev (1777)
Lev Polugaevsky,  International Grandmaster of chess
Leo Rogin, Economist and Writer
Otto Schmidt, scientist, mathematician, astronomer, geophysicist, statesman, academician
Issai Schur, mathematician
Spiridon Sobol, Belarusian enlightener and printer, in 1631 he published the first ABC-book in Belarus
Mikałaj Sudziłoŭski, revolutionary and scientist

Sports

City sports teams:

 Football: FC Torpedo Mogilev, FC Dnepr Mogilev and ZhFC Dnepr Mogilev, Nadezhda Mogilev
 Hockey: HK Mogilev
 Volleyball: Mogilev Lions, Kommunalnik
 Handball: Masheka
 Basketball: BC Borisfen

Twin towns – sister cities

Mogilev is twinned with:

 Al Rayyan, Qatar
 Bursa, Turkey
 Changsha, China
 Eisenach, Germany
 Gabrovo, Bulgaria
 Kerch, Ukraine

 Kragujevac, Serbia
 Mykolaiv, Ukraine
 Nanjing, China
 Penza, Russia
 Sokolinaya Gora (Moscow), Russia
 Sumgait, Azerbaijan
 Tabriz, Iran
 Tula, Russia
 Villeurbanne, France
 Wittenberg, Germany

 Yuzhne, Ukraine
 Zhengzhou, China
 Zvenigorod, Russia

References

External links 

 Mogilev city executive committee
 Photos on Radzima.org
 Historic images of Mogilev
 Mogilev Jewish Center 
 Jewish Encyclopedia on Moghilef (Mohilev)
 
 The murder of the Jews of Mogilev during World War II, at Yad Vashem website
 

City and regional maps of Mogilev
Best zoomable map of Mogilev and Belarus available, possible to see Voblasts, Rajons, cities and streets -> In page click KAPTbI up in the middle
Good overview map of roads and railways
General overview of Baltics, Belarus and east-europe
Belarus, topographic map

General detail, downloadable PDF map of Belarus

 
Cities in Belarus
Populated places in Mogilev Region
Mstislaw Voivodeship
Mogilyovsky Uyezd (Mogilev Governorate)
Shtetls
Holocaust locations in Belarus
Populated places on the Dnieper in Belarus